Area code 806 is a telephone area code in the North American Numbering Plan (NANP) for the U.S. state of Texas in the Panhandle and South Plains, including the cities of Amarillo and Lubbock. It was created in 1957 in a flash-cut from numbering plan area (NPA) 915, the north-western corner of the state, but also incorporated a small portion of the region of area code 817 to the east.

Prior to October 2021, area code 806 had telephone numbers assigned for the central office code 988. In 2020, 988 was designated nationwide as a dialing code for the National Suicide Prevention Lifeline, which created a conflict for exchanges that permit seven-digit dialing. This area code was therefore scheduled to transition to ten-digit dialing by October 24, 2021.

Service area
Counties:
Armstrong, Bailey, Borden, Briscoe, Carson, Castro, Cochran, Collingsworth, Cottle, Crosby, Dallam, Dawson, Deaf Smith, Dickens, Donley, Floyd, Gaines, Garza, Gray, Hale, Hall, Hansford, Hartley, Hemphill, Hockley, Hutchinson, Kent, King, Lamb, Lipscomb, Lubbock, Lynn, Moore, Motley, Ochiltree, Oldham, Parmer, Potter, Randall, Roberts, Sherman, Swisher, Terry, Wheeler and Yoakum

Towns and cities: 
Abernathy, Adrian, Afton, Aiken, Alanreed, Allison, Amarillo, Amherst, Anton, Bledsoe, Booker, Borger, Bovina, Boys Ranch, Briscoe, Brownfield, Bula, Bushland, Cactus, Canadian, Canyon, Channing, Clarendon, Claude, Cotton Center, Crosbyton, Dalhart, Darrouzett, Dawn, Dickens, Dimmitt, Dodson, Dougherty, Dumas, Earth, Edmonson, Enochs, Estelline, Farnsworth, Farwell, Fieldton, Flomot, Floydada, Follett, Friona, Fritch, Gail, Girard, Groom, Gruver, Guthrie, Hale Center, Happy, Hart, Hartley, Hedley, Hereford, Higgins, Idalou, Jayton, Justiceburg, Kerrick, Kress, Lakeview, Lamesa, Lazbuddie, Lefors, Lelia Lake, Levelland, Lipscomb, Littlefield, Lockney, Loop, Lorenzo, Lubbock, Maple, Masterson, Matador, McAdoo, McLean, Meadow, Memphis, Miami, Mobeetie, Morse, Morton, Muleshoe, Nazareth, New Deal, New Home, O'Donnell, Olton, Paducah, Pampa, Panhandle, Pep, Perryton, Petersburg, Plains, Plainview, Posey, Post, Quail, Quitaque, Ralls, Ransom Canyon, Roaring Springs, Ropesville, Samnorwood, Sanford, Seagraves,  Shallowater, Shamrock, Silverton, Skellytown, Slaton, Smyer, South Plains, Spade, Spearman, Springlake, Spur, Stinnett, Stratford, Sudan, Summerfield, Sundown, Sunray, Tahoka, Texline, Tokio, Tulia, Turkey, Umbarger, Vega, Waka, Wayside, Welch, Wellington, Wellman, Wheeler, White Deer, Whiteface, Whitharral, Wildorado, Wilson, and Wolfforth

See also
List of Texas area codes

References

External links

List of exchanges from AreaCodeDownload.com, 806 Area Code

806
806
Amarillo, Texas
Lubbock, Texas